Kafin Hausa is a Local Government Area of Jigawa State, Nigeria. Its headquarters are in the town of Kafin Hausa.

It has an area of 1,380 km and a population of 271,058 at the 2006 census.

The postal code of the area is 731.

The Hausa language and Fulani language, now extinct, were formerly spoken in Kafin Hausa.

References

Local Government Areas in Jigawa State